"Viceversa" is a song by Italian singer-songwriter Francesco Gabbani. The song was released as a digital download on 6 February 2020 by BMG Rights Management as the second single from his fourth studio album Viceversa (2020). The song peaked at number two on the Italian Singles Chart. The song was Gabbani's entry for the Sanremo Music Festival 2020, the 70th edition of Italy's musical festival which doubles also as a selection of the act for Eurovision Song Contest, where it placed second to Diodato's "Fai rumore".

Music video
A music video for "Viceversa" was released on YouTube on 6 February 2020.

Charts

Weekly charts

Year-end charts

Certifications

Release history

References

2020 singles
2020 songs
Francesco Gabbani songs
Songs written by Francesco Gabbani